Lanne-en-Barétous is a commune in the southwestern French department of Pyrénées-Atlantiques.

See also
Communes of the Pyrénées-Atlantiques department

References

Communes of Pyrénées-Atlantiques